The Metropolitan Palace also known as Greek Catholic Archbishops Palace opposite St. George's Cathedral, Lviv has been the principal residence of the Metropolitans of the Ukrainian Greek-Catholic Church since the 16th century. The current building was erected in 1761-62 to Clement Fessinger's designs and displays traits of the transition from Baroque to Neo-Classical. The façade bears a plaque in memory of Archbishop Andrey Sheptytsky. On the west side of the palace extends an old flower garden. Pope John Paul II stayed at the palace during his 2001 visit to Ukraine.

References
 Памятники градостроительства и архитектуры Украинской ССР. Киев: Будивельник, 1983–1986. Том 3, с. 93.

Houses completed in 1762
Buildings and structures in Lviv
Ukrainian Greek Catholic Church
Neoclassical architecture in Ukraine
Neoclassical palaces
Baroque palaces in Ukraine
Episcopal palaces